Lius is a genus of beetles in the family Buprestidae, containing the following species:

 Lius aculeatus (Gory, 1841)
 Lius adonis Saunders, 1876
 Lius aeneicollis Kerremans, 1896
 Lius aeneovirens Obenberger, 1932
 Lius aeneus Kerremans, 1896
 Lius agriloides Kerremans, 1896
 Lius alvarengai Cobos, 1967
 Lius amabilis Kerremans, 1896
 Lius amazoniae Obenberger, 1932
 Lius aquiles Cobos, 1967
 Lius ares Saunders, 1876
 Lius aterrimus Kerremans, 1900
 Lius atratus Kerremans, 1896
 Lius atrocyaneus Kerremans, 1899
 Lius auroseriatus Obenberger, 1940
 Lius bacchus Saunders, 1876
 Lius belial Obenberger, 1940
 Lius bergrothi Obenberger, 1924
 Lius bicolor (Kirsch, 1873)
 Lius binderi Obenberger, 1924
 Lius bolivianus Obenberger, 1932
 Lius breviceps Kerremans, 1903
 Lius bronzeus Kerremans, 1903
 Lius bruchi Kerremans, 1903
 Lius bucki Cobos, 1967
 Lius buenavistae Obenberger, 1932
 Lius callimicriformis Fisher, 1933
 Lius carinatus Kerremans, 1903
 Lius carmineus Kerremans, 1896
 Lius castor Saunders, 1876
 Lius clarus Kerremans, 1897
 Lius coelestis Obenberger, 1923
 Lius coeruleus Kerremans, 1900
 Lius conicus (Gory & Laporte, 1840)
 Lius convexus Kerremans, 1899
 Lius cordieri Obenberger, 1924
 Lius cuneiformis Fisher, 1922
 Lius cupreolus Obenberger, 1923
 Lius cupreus Kerremans, 1903
 Lius cupricollis Thomson, 1879
 Lius cyanellus Kerremans, 1896
 Lius cycnus Saunders, 1876
 Lius dichrous Obenberger, 1924
 Lius difficilis (Waterhouse, 1889)
 Lius dimidiatus Kerremans, 1897
 Lius dissimilis Waterhouse, 1889
 Lius elateroides Kerremans, 1896
 Lius elongatus Kerremans, 1896
 Lius emarginatus (Kirsch, 1873)
 Lius eolo Cobos, 1967
 Lius ephialtes Saunders, 1876
 Lius exiguus (Gory & Laporte, 1840)
 Lius fennahi Théry, 1947
 Lius finitimus Obenberger, 1923
 Lius geraensis Obenberger, 1940
 Lius gounelli Kerremans, 1903
 Lius grouvellei Kerremans, 1896
 Lius hades Saunders, 1876
 Lius hector Napp, 1972
 Lius helios Saunders, 1876
 Lius hercules Saunders, 1876
 Lius hespenheidei Bellamy, 1998
 Lius hintoni Fisher, 1933
 Lius holochalceus Kerremans, 1896
 Lius ignifrons Thomson, 1879
 Lius ignitus (Gory & Laporte, 1840)
 Lius inconspicuus (Waterhouse, 1889)
 Lius jakowleffi Kerremans, 1903
 Lius joukli Obenberger, 1924
 Lius jubilans (Waterhouse, 1889)
 Lius lafertei Thomson, 1878
 Lius laticeps Kerremans, 1903
 Lius lenkoi Cobos, 1967
 Lius leo Cobos, 1967
 Lius longulus (Waterhouse, 1889)
 Lius maerens (Gory, 1841)
 Lius magdalenae Obenberger, 1932
 Lius magnus Kerremans, 1897
 Lius mequignoni Obenberger, 1932
 Lius mexicanus Fisher, 1922
 Lius minutus Kerremans, 1896
 Lius modestus Kerremans, 1897
 Lius mrazi Obenberger, 1923
 Lius nigerrimus Kerremans, 1896
 Lius observans (Kirsch, 1873)
 Lius orion Obenberger, 1923
 Lius otus Saunders, 1876
 Lius paraguayensis Obenberger, 1923
 Lius parvulus Waterhouse, 1889
 Lius pauli Obenberger, 1923
 Lius pereirai Cobos, 1967
 Lius phlegmon Obenberger, 1923
 Lius pilithorax Obenberger, 1932
 Lius placidus (Waterhouse, 1889)
 Lius pluto Cobos, 1967
 Lius politus Saunders, 1876
 Lius pollux Saunders, 1876
 Lius poseidon Napp, 1972
 Lius preissi Obenberger, 1923
 Lius protractulus Obenberger, 1940
 Lius proximus Thomson, 1879
 Lius puberulus Obenberger, 1923
 Lius purpurescens Thomson, 1879
 Lius reflexus Kerremans, 1903
 Lius rugosus Kerremans, 1903
 Lius sagittus Obenberger, 1923
 Lius semenovi Obenberger, 1932
 Lius simplex Thomson, 1879
 Lius simulator Obenberger, 1924
 Lius skrlandti Obenberger, 1932
 Lius splendens Fisher, 1933
 Lius strandi Obenberger, 1923
 Lius strigosus Kerremans, 1903
 Lius subtilipilis Obenberger, 1940
 Lius tantillus Obenberger, 1924
 Lius tenebrosus Cobos, 1967
 Lius tenuifrons Obenberger, 1932
 Lius tercus Saunders, 1876
 Lius tomentosus Thomson, 1879
 Lius tristis Kerremans, 1897
 Lius tucumanus (Kerremans, 1887)
 Lius vanrooni Obenberger, 1923
 Lius variabilis Waterhouse, 1889
 Lius vicinus Kerremans, 1899
 Lius viridis Kerremans, 1897
 Lius waterhousei Hespenheide, 1973

References

Further reading
Bellamy, C. L. (2003). Lius Deyrolle, 1865 (Insecta, Coleoptera): proposed conservation. Bulletin of Zoological Nomenclature 60(2) 132–33.

Buprestidae genera